Caraiba is a monotypic genus of snake in the family Colubridae. The genus contains the sole species Caraiba andreae, also known commonly as the black and white racer or the Cuban lesser racer, which is endemic to Cuba. There are six recognized subspecies.

Etymology
The genus name, Caraiba, is a reference to the Caribbean. The specific name, andreae, is in honor of a Danish ship's master, "Captain Andrea", who collected the holotype.

Geographic range
C. andreae is found throughout Cuba. It is also found on Isla de la Juventud (formerly called Isle of Pines), and on other smaller offshore islands.

Habitat

Description
Dorsally, C. andreae is black, with a dorso-lateral series of yellow spots on each side. The upper labials are white. Ventrally it is white, with black markings.

Reproduction
C. andreae is oviparous.

Subspecies
The following six subspecies are recognized as being valid, including the nominotypical subspecies.
Caraiba andreae andreae 
Caraiba andreae melopyrrha 
Caraiba andreae morenoi 
Caraiba andreae nebulatus 
Caraiba andreae orientalis 
Caraiba andreae peninsulae 

Nota bene: A trinomial authority in parentheses indicates that the subspecies was originally described in a genus other than Caraiba.

References

Further reading
Barbour T (1916). "The Reptiles and Amphibians of the Isle of Pines". Annals of the Carnegie Museum 10 (1–2): 297–308 + Plate XXVIII. (Leimadophis nebulatus, new species, pp. 305–306 + Plate XXVIII, figures 1–2).
Barbour T, Ramsden CT (1919). "The Herpetology of Cuba". Memoirs of the Museum of Comparative Zoölogy at Harvard College 47 (2): 69–213 + Plates 1–15. (Leimadophis andreae orientalis, new subspecies, p. 196).
Garrido OH (1973). "Nuevas subespecies de reptiles para Cuba". Torreia, nueva serie 30: 1–31. (Antillophis andreae morenoi, new subspecies, p. 18). (in Spanish).
Reinhardt J, Lütken CF (1862). "Bildrag til det vestindiske Öriges og navnligen til de dansk-vestindiske Öers Herpetologie". Videnskabelige Meddelelser fra den naturhistoriske Forening i Kjöbenhavn 1862 (10–18): 153–291. (Liophis andreæ, new species, pp. 214–216). (in Danish & Latin).
Schwartz A, Henderson RW (1991). Amphibians and Reptiles of the West Indies: Descriptions, Distributions, and Natural History. Gainesville: University of Florida Press. 720 pp. .
Schwartz A, Thomas R (1960). "Four New Snakes (Tropidophis, Dromicus, Alsophis) from the Isla de Piños and Cuba". Herpetologica 16 (2): 73–90. (Dromicus andreae peninsulae, new subspecies, p. 81).
Schwartz A, Thomas R (1975). A Check-list of West Indian Amphibians and Reptiles. Carnegie Museum of Natural History Special Publication No. 1. Pittsburgh, Pennsylvania: Carnegie Museum of Natural History. 216 pp. (Antillophis andreai, pp. 174–175).
Thomas R, Garrido OH (1967). "A New Subspecies of Dromicus andreae (Serpentes, Colubridae)". Annals of Carnegie Museum 39: 219–226. (Dromicus andreae melopyrrha, new subspecies, pp. 219–222, Figure 1d).
Zaher H, Grazziotin FG, Cadle JE, Murphy RW, Moura-Leite JC, Bonatto SL (2009). "Molecular phylogeny of advanced snakes (Serpentes, Caenophidia) with an emphasis on South American Xenodontines: a revised classification and descriptions of new taxa". Papéis Avulsos de Zoologia, Museu de Zoologia da Universidade de São Paulo 49 (11): 115–153. (Caraiba, new genus, p. 148). (in English, with an abstract in Portuguese).

Dipsadinae
Monotypic snake genera
Reptiles of Cuba
Endemic fauna of Cuba
Snakes of the Caribbean